RESQ is a brand of energy drink which was originally developed in Austria in 1999 and was intended to be sold exclusively on the North American beverage market. Starting in 2008, the product also became available in Europe and Asia.

Beverage product description 
RESQ is a cold packaged, non-alcoholic, sports drink (producing company however calls it "powerdrink") with natural ingredients used. According to the manufacturer, the composition of ingredients is supposed to stimulate the metabolism, blood circulation and the central nervous system. The chosen ingredients can assist the human body in breaking down toxins and giving it an adequate supply of energy while performing exhaustive body activity like sports for example. RESQ also bonds two known natural fat metabolizers (L-Carnitine and Taurine), with two energy stimulants (Guarana and Ginseng) and other B-vitamins. The manufacturer does not make any medical claims but refers to publications of the U.S. Food and Drug Administration (FDA) for products’ and ingredients’ benefits. The product is filled in typical 250 ml (8.4 oz) aluminium cans.

Product taste 
RESQ is featuring a not too sweet and refreshing citrus-like flavor with a slightly potent bite to the finish. According to an independent beverage rating website, BevNet, the drink has a clean flavor which is “definitely consumable, and easy to swallow” and does not have the typical bubblegum/caffeine flavor which many drinks of the same energy drink category are known for.

Brand recognition & design 
The worldwide registered trademark “RESQ” shows a combined wordplay derived from the English word “rescue” and the pronunciations of the single alphabet letter “Q” which is shown as a stylized life-saver and the indication of a sidewise Q-stroke.

Promotional efforts & RESQ Racing 
In April 2008, IndyCar Series driver Sarah Fisher announced that RESQ would sponsor her IndyCar team for the 2008 Indianapolis 500.  The first race car was completely redesigned and outfitted with the original blue tone colors of a RESQ aluminium can completely reflecting the brand's image and design of the drink's can. 

In May and June 2008, numerous press statements by SFR and media coverage nationwide alleged promised sponsorship payments had not been made. SFR motivated fans to start a campaign and call RESQ's corporate office. 

In July 2008, RESQ announced on their website that they had not signed a contract with Sarah Fisher Racing. Instead, RESQ had at one time negotiated with Gravity Motorsports, a subsidiary of Gravity Entertainment, about a possible marketing cooperation for the drink in the racing business. The contract had not proceeded and negotiations were permanently suspended. Legal action was commenced against Gravity Entertainment, and RESQ apologised to the racing industry and fans for the saga.

Corporate information 
The brand is owned by a private U.S. corporation named RESQ INC.

RESQ clothing products 
RESQ INC. also designs and produces standardized professional quality functional wear and casual clothing for public safety workers and agencies in the United States and Europe. The company holds several patents in different international registered trademark classes for garments produced in Europe and North America mainly intended for fire and rescue services.

References

Indystar article
Official INDYCAR article
Indiana Racing press conference of 8 April 2008 - audio transcript
Indianapolis Motor Speedway official press conference
Open Wheeler Racers news release
F1SA news article
Motorsports.com article

External links
Official product website
RESQ racing website
Official Sarah Fisher Race Team Website

Energy drinks